Olympic Light heavyweight boxing champion Cassius Clay (later Muhammad Ali) fought Tunney Hunsaker in a six-round match on October 29, 1960. Clay won the bout through a unanimous decision on points. This was Ali's first fight as a professional. Hunsaker was a part time boxer who was for many years a respected police officer in Fayetteville, West Virginia. He also helped to train young fighters and he and Ali were friends for many years afterwards. In a 1980 Sports Illustrated article, Hunsaker said he didn't agree with Ali refusing to be drafted during the Vietnam war, but he still respected him greatly as a fighter and as a man.

References

Hunsaker
1960 in boxing
October 1960 sports events in the United States